Barumbadings (also known as Barumbadings: Vol 1. Dead Mother, Dead All) is a 2021 Philippine black comedy crime action film written and directed by Darryl Yap. It stars Joel Torre, Jeric Raval, Mark Anthony Fernandez, Baron Geisler and John Lapus. The film is about a three gay gangsters mourn the death of their gay guardian, but ends up celebrating his bright and colorful life. The main characters are named after the main members of the SexBomb Girls and their manager, Joy Cancio.

Cast
 Joel Torre as Mother Joy: The one who adopted the three gays, Izzy, Jopay and Rochelle.
 Jeric Raval as Izzy 
 Mark Anthony Fernandez as Jopay
 Baron Geisler as Rochelle 
 John Lapus as Queenpin: The leader of Barumbadings and the one who giving orders to Izzy, Jopay and Rochelle.
 Francine Garcia as Trixie
 Cecil Paz as Buchi the Butcher: Queenpin ex-lover.
 Carlo Mendoza as Young Rochelle
 Janrey Torres as Young Izzy
 Lance Russell Obrero as Young Jopay
 Jobelyn Manuel as Right Finger of Buchi
 Loren Mirañas as Left Finger of Buchi

Release
The film was released in the Philippines via streaming in Vivamax on November 5, 2021.

Reception
JE CC of PinoyFeeds give the film a positive review and he wrote:

Future
Baron Geisler confirmed that he is part of all 4 upcoming sequels of Barumbadings.

References

External links
 

Philippine crime action films
Philippine LGBT-related films
Philippine black comedy films
2020s Tagalog-language films
2021 LGBT-related films
Viva Films films
Gay-related films